Alstonia rupestris is a species of plant in the family Apocynaceae. It is endemic to Thailand.

References

Endemic flora of Thailand
rupestris
Least concern plants
Taxonomy articles created by Polbot